The GMA Network Center is the headquarters and broadcast complex of the GMA Network, a major radio and television network in the Philippines. It is located at EDSA corner Timog Avenue, Diliman, Quezon City. It is the network's main television and radio production center, and its main transmission facility for most of Metro Manila. The building houses Super Radyo DZBB 594 AM, Barangay LS 97.1 FM, GMA-7 and GTV-27.

GMA inaugurated the facility on June 14, 2000, the birthdate of GMA Network, as part of the kick-off of its year-round celebration of its 50th golden anniversary. While the first phase of the project has already been completed with the completion of the 17-storey high-rise building, the center has an option to upgrade the older, existing facilities in the GMA compound, as originally planned.

The center is equipped with MARC (Multiple Automated Recorder Cassette) System with a D3 format digital video recorder and a Broadcast Automation System that allows the network to manage live feeds and international feeds that will be carried out to GMA Pinoy TV, GMA Life TV and, GMA News TV International subscribers around the world.

Offices 
GMA Network Center serves as the corporate office of the company. Most of the core departments of the company like the human resources, finance, and marketing are located in the building. The newsroom of GMA Integrated News and GMA News Online is located on the 2nd floor. The production offices and staff offices of GMA Integrated News and Public Affairs, GMA Entertainment Group, GMA Regional TV, and GMA International are also based on the building. The network's post-production unit, engineering department, program management, and talent development (Sparkle GMA Artist Center) are also located in the building.

Some of the network's subsidiaries are also based here. The GMA New Media, Inc. (NMI) and its subsidiary, Digify are located in the twelfth floor while the Worldwide division of the network is on tenth floor. Also, the management and staffs of GMA Network Films, GMA Music, and Script2010 are located here.

The Complex 
The GMA Network complex has a total area of 17,184 square-meters (including the 4,053 sqm Studio Annex) located in EDSA corner Timog Avenue, Brgy. South Triangle, Diliman, Quezon City. The complex is the main headquarters and the main radio and television production hub of the network. It contains several building, including the GMA Network Center and GMA Network Studio Annex.

The network has held office in the complex since 1957 with its television broadcasts started in 1961, having moved from the Calvo Building in Escolta, Manila (where the network, then known as Loreto de F. Hemedes, Inc., later renamed Republic Broadcasting System, had its first studios and corporate offices since its inception in 1950).

The complex contains seven studios and various production hubs for its production arms, GMA Integrated News and Public Affairs and GMA Entertainment Group. It also houses radio studios for Super Radyo DZBB 594 kHz and Barangay LS 97.1, as well as recording studios for GMA Music. A convenience store, canteen, and ATM are also available serving the employees working in the complex.

The buildings between the Network Center and Studio Annex contains several studios and production offices, as well as the Kapuso Center, where the GMA Kapuso Foundation, the "Action Center" for Sumbungan ng Bayan, and the office of the public service show, Kapwa Ko Mahal Ko. One of the buildings here served as the studios and offices of Barangay LS 97.1 and Super Radyo DZBB before moving to the Studio Annex. This area is believe to become the site for the new building to be built in the complex.

On the Network Center's front, a sculpture called "Beyond Broadcasting" was built and designed by the artist, Eduardo Castrillo.

Studios
GMA Network has seven studios in the complex. The studios were named Studios 1-7 (except German Moreno Studio) based on their size. Three of the studios (Studios 2, 3, and 5) are located in the GMA Network Center while Studios 1 and 4 are on the old GMA Building between the Network Center and Studio Annex. While German Moreno Studio and the Studio 7 are located on the GMA Network Studio Annex. Studios 2, 3, and 5 are currently used by GMA Integrated News and Public Affairs programs. While the remaining studios are being used by entertainment programs, with Studios 1 and 4 are for small production that needs no audience or just small audience and German Moreno Studio and Studio 7 are used by large production that needs large audience or big set. All the studios in the complex is in high-definition and considered state-of-the-art. Studios in the old GMA Building are currently being renovated.

• Studio 1 - is a studio located on the old GMA Building. It is one of the oldest and smallest studios in the complex. Some of GMA News TV's (now GTV) defunct programs are being taped here. Currently, this studio is under renovation.

• Studio 2 – is the second smallest studio in the complex. The studio is equipped with HD video systems and cameras, as well as audio systems like audio mixer and overrides. The studio is currently used by GTV's noontime newscast, Balitanghali, afternoon news and magazine show, Dapat Alam Mo!, and State of the Nation. The green screen used on weather reports of GMA News' programs is also located here.

In 2022, the studio was renovated for the Eleksyon 2022, the 2022 Philippine national and local elections coverage of GMA Integrated News and Public Affairs. The newly renovated studio was designed by the Emmy award-winning US firm, FX Design Group and uses the latest technology from Vizrt and Red Spy. It features LED video walls, color-changing panels, and an open-floor space.

• Studio 3 – is the third smallest studio in the complex. It is the home studio of the Philippines' longest-running morning show, Unang Hirit.

• Studio 4 - is the fourth largest studio in the complex. It is located in the old GMA Building and one of the oldest studios in the complex. The studio is currently occupied by the Saturday morning talk and lifestyle show, Sarap, 'Di Ba?.

• Studio 5 - is the third largest studio in the complex. It is one of the most technologically advanced studio in the country. It is equipped with state-of-the-art broadcast equipment like HD video systems, audio systems, and cameras. In 2019, the studio was renovated. The renovation makes the studio equipped with augmented reality (AR) technology and immersive graphics by Vizrt. The studio has large video walls, video floors, and a lot of TV screens used by news programs. GMA's flagship newscasts, 24 Oras and its weekend edition, as well as the late night newscast, Saksi are being broadcast live in this studio.

• German Moreno Studio – formerly Studio 6, is the second largest studio of GMA. It is located in the GMA Network Studio Annex. The studio's total area is 638-square-meter that can accommodate an audience of more than 400. The studio was named after the late German "Kuya Germs" Moreno on its 85th birthday on October 4, 2018. Like other studios, it is also equipped with HD video systems, audio systems, and lighting system. It is the former home of Walang Tulugan with the Master Showman and Wowowin. The studio currently houses TiktoClock.

• Studio 7 - is a 1020-square-meter studio in the GMA Network Studio Annex that can accommodate up to 600 audience. It is the largest studio in the complex and one of the largest in the Philippines. The studio is equipped with HD video systems, lighting system, and state-of-the-art audio systems that can be used on musical shows and live concerts. It is the first studio in the country installed with aluminum truss motorized suspension system. It is used by various shows of GMA like All-Out Sundays, The Boobay and Tekla Show, Bubble Gang, and most of the reality and game shows produced by the network.

GMA Network Studio Annex
GMA Network Studio Annex is a 4-storey television facility owned by GMA Network. It was built in a 4,308-square meter land that is part of the 17,184-square meter complex in the Brgy. South Triangle, Diliman, Quezon City. The structure costs as much as PhP1 billion. The construction was begun in 2006 and completed in 2008.

The building houses two state-of-the art HD studios, as well as offices for GMA Network's subsidiaries and departments. It also houses studio support facilities, set construction facilities, set and props storage, and facilities for broadcast equipment. Some production offices of GMA Integrated News and Public Affairs and GMA Entertainment Group are located on the third and fourth floor of the building. Aside from offices, the building has also rehearsal rooms, dressing rooms, and make-up room for the network's talents, as well as conference rooms and editing rooms for pre-production and post-production of programs. A bridge also connects the building to the rest of the compound.

The Studio Annex was unveiled on October 17, 2008, with a red carpet event attended by the network's personalities, executives and government officials including the country's then-president Gloria Macapagal-Arroyo and then-vice president Noli de Castro.

On 2021, Radio GMA (RGMA Network), the owner of Super Radyo DZBB and Barangay LS 97.1, moved to the third floor of the building. The new office has two studios (one for the FM station and one for AM station), as well as technical rooms for radio and television broadcasting and office for anchors and management.

Studios
There are two studios in the building, the German Moreno Studio (formerly Studio 6) and the Studio 7. Both studios are equipped with HD video system, audio equipment, and lighting system, as well as self-climbing hoist that is used in big studios, theaters, and concert halls worldwide. Also, both studios are equipped with Digital Speaker Management systems that standardize digital feedback elimination, ensure accurate sound quality, and allow studio-to-studio link for multi-studio audio communication.

In terms of audio equipment, both studios are designed for musical shows and live concerts through their state-of-the-art audio systems.

The building is beside MRT Station and EDSA so loud noise from these is a major problem for the studios. As a solution, the network used box-in-a-box concept or room-in-a-room concept wherein the walls of the studios are located inside the building to block the noise from outside. The visible room is enclosed with a bigger room acting as a sound barrier.

Kapuso Walk of Fame
On March 24, 2014, GMA Network launched its own version of "Walk of Fame" at the studios' walkway, with over 196 celebrities and news & public affairs personalities received the plaque. The concept of this "Walk of Fame" was done by the late German "Kuya Germs" Moreno, who was also behind the Eastwood City's Walk of Fame.

The new batch with 20 personalities have their stars inducted on December 12, 2019.

Future

GMA Network plans to construct a new building and state-of-the-art studios within the complex.

References

GMA Network (company)
Mass media company headquarters in the Philippines
Office buildings in Metro Manila
Television studios in the Philippines
Buildings and structures in Quezon City